Planet End is an album by jazz guitarist Larry Coryell that was released in 1975 by Vanguard Records. The album was produced by Daniel Weiss and engineered by David Baker. It was the final recording for Vanguard and reached number 39 on the 1976 Jazz Albums chart. The album consists of tracks recorded in 1974 by the then-current line-up of Coryell's band The Eleventh House (before Danny Trifan was replaced by John Lee on bass); plus two outtakes from the March 1969 sessions that produced the 1970 album, Spaces.

Track listing

Personnel

1974 tracks
The Eleventh House
 Larry Coryell – guitar (1,3)
 Mike Lawrence – trumpet (1,3)
 Mike Mandel – electric piano & synthesizer (1,3)
 Danny Trifan – bass (1,3)
 Alphonse Mouzon – drums, percussion (1,3)

Larry Coryell solo
 Larry Coryell – all instruments (4)

1969 tracks
 Larry Coryell – guitar (2,5)
 John McLaughlin – guitar (2,5)
 Chick Corea – electric piano (2)
 Miroslav Vitous – bass (2,5)
 Billy Cobham – drums (2,5)

Charts

References

1975 albums
Larry Coryell albums
Vanguard Records albums